The grapheme Ȟ, ȟ (H with caron) is a letter used in the Finnish Kalo language and the Lakota language. It represents a voiceless velar fricative in the former and a voiceless uvular fricative in the latter.

Computing codes

References
 

Latin letters with diacritics